Predrag Jovanović may refer to:

 Predrag Jovanović (born 1950), Serbian musician and entertainer, known by his stage alias Peđa D'Boy
 Predrag Jovanović (footballer) (born 1965), retired Serbian football player